São Jorge (also: São Jorge dos Órgãos) is a settlement in the central part of the island of Santiago, Cape Verde. It is part of the São Lourenço dos Órgãos municipality. In 2010 its population was 6. It is situated 2.5 km southwest of João Teves and 4 km southeast of Picos. Its elevation is 319 meters.

It is home to the Jardim Botânico (Botanical Garden), the only one in Cape Verde. There is also a research institute of the School of Agricultural and Environmental Sciences, part of the University of Cape Verde.

Notable person
The writer Tomé Varela da Silva was born in the village in 1950.

References

External links

Villages and settlements in Santiago, Cape Verde
São Lourenço dos Órgãos